Universities Ranking of China released by CUAA (Chinese Universities Alumni Association) is one of the most foremost domestic university rankings. The initiation of the CUAA-Team of China University Evaluation can be traced back to the Research Group of Comparative Studies of Universities in Chinese Academy of Management Science founded in 1989. The Team has the longest history of consistent evaluation and study of Chinese universities with over 30 years. The annual Evaluation and Study Report of Universities in China includes General Ranking based on

General Ranking

Billionaire Ranking
In first decade of the 21st century, many Chinese media have been very active in making ranking lists for Chinese colleges and universities according to the number of billionaires they have produced.

These ranking lists are often seen in Chinese TV, newspapers, books, and even academic studies and publications. Such rankings are normally made annually. Most of these rankings are based on the billionaire rankings made by Forbes (American business magazine) and Hurun Report (a business ranking specialized company based in mainland China).

Citation based on:
 Forbes: The World's Billionaires
 Huren Report: Huren Top 100 Billionaires (胡润百富)

Methodology

The methodology for these rankings is rather simple: the amount of billionaire a university or college have, including its alumni and ffaculty.

Notable ranking source

There are several notable ranking entities, and most of them are also Internet-based and have their own homepages.
 2010: Chinese university billionaire investigation, from the Chinese University Alumni Association (CUAA).
 2009 Chinese University Business-making Ranking, from People.com.cn (one of the largest and most popular Chinese websites).
 2009 List of billionaire alumni of Chinese universities, full list from Tencent QQ News.

Ranking
The most recent ranking is: (only top 10 are listed out as below) measured in billion Chinese Yuan.

See also
 Rankings of universities in China
 University rankings in China
 Billionaire
 List of people by net worth of the People's Republic of China
 List of Hong Kong people by net worth
 List of countries by the number of US dollar billionaires
 List of universities in China
 Project 211
 Project 985
 863 Program

References

University and college rankings
Science and technology in the People's Republic of China
Higher education in China
Universities in China